Fraserdale station is a railway station in Fraserdale, Ontario, on the Ontario Northland's Polar Bear Express. It is a flag stop with no station structure.

External links
Polar Bear Express Service Map

Ontario Northland Railway stations
Railway stations in Cochrane District